Euxoa henrietta is a moth of the family Noctuidae. It is found in North America, including Washington, Montana and California.

External links
Images
Bug Guide

Euxoa
Moths described in 1900